Local elections were held in Cebu on May 13, 2013, within the Philippine general election. Voters will select candidates for all local positions: a town mayor, vice mayor and town councilors, as well as members of the Sangguniang Panlalawigan, the vice-governor, governor and  representatives for the six districts of Cebu. Incumbent governor Gwendolyn Garcia is barred for seeking another term because she is limited to three terms only.

Gubernatorial and vice gubernatorial election
On April 27, 2012, incumbent governor Gwendolyn Garcia announced her intention to run for senator. She also announced that her brother incumbent 3rd District Representative Pablo John Garcia will be running as governor of the province. On September 1, 2012, One Cebu announced that former Danao vice mayor Ramon "Boboy" Durano IV as Garcia's running mate.

On May 12, 2012, businessman Glenn Soco announced his intention to run for vice governor. He ran for that position in 2010 as running mate of Garcia. However, he lost to incumbent Greg Sanchez. He filed a protest, but Sanchez died on April 29, 2011.

On May 25, 2012, Garcia joined PDP-Laban and was included in the senatorial line-up of the United Nationalist Alliance.

On September 20, 2012 Vice President Jejomar Binay announced that Garcia withdrew her senatorial bid and will run for the House of Representatives instead.

On September 28, 2012, Hilario Davide III, was announced by the Liberal Party as its candidate for governor. Davide first ran in 2010, but was defeated by Garcia. His running-mate is incumbent vice governor Agnes Magpale of the Barug Alang sa Kauswagan ug Demokrasya or Bakud. Magpale assumed as vice governor upon the death of former vice governor Greg Sanchez.

On December 17, 2012, Incumbent governor Gwendolyn Garcia ordered a six-month suspension. (See full description about the suspension here)

Provincial Elections
The candidates for governor and vice governor with the highest number of votes wins the seat; they are voted separately, therefore, they may be of different parties when elected.

Candidates for Governor
Parties are as stated in their certificate of candidacies.

Incumbent Gwendolyn Garcia is on her third term and is ineligible to run. She is running for congresswoman. Her brother, incumbent congressman Pablo John Garcia is running in her place.

Candidates for Vice-Governor
Agnes Magpale is the incumbent after vice governor Gregorio Sanchez (+) died, she is running against businessman Glenn Soco and former Danao city vice mayor Ramon Durano IV.

Congressional elections 
Each of Cebu's Six and 3 others legislative districts will elect each representative to the House of Representatives. The candidate with the highest number of votes wins the seat.

1st District
Incumbent Eduardo Gullas is term limited; he will run for mayor of Talisay City. His party nominated his grandson, Gerald Anthony.

2nd District
Pablo Garcia is the incumbent.

3rd District
Incumbent Pablo John Garcia is running for governor instead. His sister Incumbent Governor Gwendolyn Garcia is party's nominee.

4th District
Benhur Salimbangon is the incumbent.

5th District
Incumbent Ramon Durano VI is term-limited and running for Danao city vice mayor instead, his brother former tourism secretary Joseph Ace Durano is running under Liberal.

6th District
Gabriel Luis Quisimbing is the incumbent, his opponent is former congresswoman Nerissa Corazon Soon-Ruiz running under UNA

Cebu City

1st District
Incumbent Rachel del Mar is not running to give way to her father, former congressman Raul del Mar who is vying for seat again, he will face actress and manager Annabelle Rama-Gutierrez.

2nd District
Incumbent Tomas Osmeña is running for mayor against incumbent Cebu City mayor Mike Rama, his party nominated Rodrigo Abellanosa for south district congressional post.

Lapu-Lapu City

Incumbent Arturo Radaza is not running, his daughter Aileen Radaza is party's nominee.

Sangguniang Panlalawigan elections
All 6 Districts of Cebu will elect Sangguniang Panlalawigan or provincial board members.

1st District
 City: Carcar, Naga City, Talisay City
 Municipalities: Minglanilla, San Fernando, Sibonga

|-
|colspan=5 bgcolor=black|

|-

2nd District
 Municipalities: Alcantara, Alcoy, Alegria, Argao, Badian, Boljoon, Dalaguete, Dumanjug, Ginatilan, Malabuyoc, Moalboal, Oslob, Ronda, Samboan, Santander

|-
|colspan=5 bgcolor=black|

|-

3rd District
 City: Toledo City
 Municipalities: Aloguinsan, Asturias, Balamban, Barili, Pinamungajan, Tuburan,

|-
|colspan=5 bgcolor=black|

|-

4th District
 City: Bogo
 Municipalities: Bantayan, Daanbantayan, Madridejos, Medellin, San Remigio, Santa Fe, Tabogon, Tabuelan

|-
|colspan=5 bgcolor=black|

|-

5th District
 City: Danao
 Municipalities: Borbon, Carmen, Catmon, Compostela, Liloan, Pilar, Poro, San Francisco, Sogod, Tudela

|-
|colspan=5 bgcolor=black|

|-

6th District
 City: Mandaue City
 Municipalities: Consolacion, Cordova

|-
|colspan=5 bgcolor=black|

|-

City and Municipal elections
All municipalities and City of Cebu will elect mayor and vice-mayor this election. The candidates for mayor and vice mayor with the highest number of votes wins the seat; they are voted separately, therefore, they may be of different parties when elected. Below is the list of mayoralty and vice-mayoralty candidates of each city and municipalities per district.

1st District, Mayoral election
 City: Carcar, Naga City, Talisay City
 Municipalities: Minglanilla, San Fernando, Sibonga

Carcar
Nicepuro Apura is the incumbent. his primary opponent is councilor Roberto Aleonar, Jr.

Naga City
Valdemar Chiong is the incumbent.

Talisay City
Incumbent Socrates Fernandez is not running. Congressman Eduardo Gullas is his party's nominee.

Minglanilla
Incumbent Eduardo Selma is not running, His party nominate vice mayor Elanito Peña.

San Fernando
Neneth Reluya is the incumbent.

Sibonga
Lionel Bacaltos is the incumbent.

2nd District, Mayoral Election
 Municipalities: Alcantara, Alcoy, Alegria, Argao, Badian, Boljoon, Dalaguete, Dumanjug, Ginatilan, Malabuyoc, Moalboal, Oslob, Ronda, Samboan, Santander

Alcantara
Prudencio Barino, Jr. is the incumbent. his opponent is councilor Fredo Cañete.

Alcoy
Nick Delo Santos is the incumbent. his opponent is councilor Ompong Delo Santos.

Alegria
Incumbent Emelita Guisadio is not running, her husband Raul Guisadio is running for her place.

Argao
Incumbent Edsel Galeos is running for his reelection unopposed.

Badian
Robburt Librando is the incumbent. he will face vice mayor Fructouso Caballero.

Boljoon
Incumbent Teresita Delis is not running, vice mayor Merlou Derama is her party's nominee.

Dalaguete
Incumbent Ronald Allan Cesante is running for her reelection unopposed.

Dumanjug
Nelson Garcia is the incumbent.

Ginatilan
Incumbent Antonio Singco is term-limited, vice mayor Dean Michael Singco is his party's nominee.

Malabuyoc
Incumbent Daisy Creus is not running, vice mayor Lito Creus is her party's nominee.

Moalboal
Innocentes Cabaron is the incumbent.

Oslob
Ronald Guaren is the incumbent. his opponent is vice mayor Jun Tumulak.

Ronda
Nonie Blanco is the incumbent.

Samboan
Raymond Joseph Calderon is the incumbent. his primary opponent is vice mayor Boy Capa.

Santander
Marilyn Wenceslao is the incumbent.

3rd District, Mayoral Election
 City: Toledo City
 Municipalities: Aloguinsan, Asturias, Balamban, Barili, Pinamungajan, Tuburan, Tabuelan

Toledo City
Rudy Espinosa is the incumbent. his opponent is former senator John Henry Osmeña.

Aloguinsan
Incumbent Augustus Moreno is swapping post to her wife vice mayor Cynthia Moreno. Cynthia challenger is councilor Malou Ripdos.

Asturias
Incumbent Alan Adlawan is running for his reelection unopposed.

Balamban
Ace Binghay is the incumbent.

Barili
Teresito Mariñas is the incumbent. his opponent is vice mayor Marlon Garcia.

Pinamungajan
Incumbent Geraldine Yapha is running for Congress, Estralla Yapha is her party's nominee.

Tuburan
Aljun Diamante is the incumbent.

4th District, Mayoral Election
 City: Bogo
 Municipalities: Bantayan, Daanbantayan, Madridejos, Medellin, San Remigio, Santa Fe, Tabogon, Tabuelan

Bogo
Celestino Martinez, Jr. is the incumbent. his opponent is daughter of Congressman Benhur Salimbangon, Marie Daphne Salimbangon.

Bantayan
Incumbent Ian Christopher Escario is running for his reelection unopposed.

Daanbantayan
Maria Luisa Loot is the incumbent. his opponent is Augusto Corro.

Madridejos
Salvador Dela Fuente is the incumbent.

Medellin
Ricardo Ramirez is the incumbent.

San Remigio
Jay Olivar is the incumbent. he will face former mayor Mariano Martinez.

Santa Fe
Jong Jong Ilustrisimo is the incumbent.

Tabogon
Incumbent Eusebio Dungog is not running, Roland Quinain is his party's nominee.

Tabuelan
Rex Casiano Gerona is the incumbent. his opponent is vice mayor Wilma Zamora.

5th District, Mayoral Election
 City: Danao
 Municipalities: Borbon, Carmen, Catmon, Compostela, Liloan, Pilar, Poro, San Francisco, Sogod, Tudela

Danao
Ramon Durano, Jr. is the incumbent. he will face his brother vice mayor Ramon Durano III.

Borbon
Bernard Sepulveda is the incumbent.

Carmen
Gerard Villamor is the incumbent.

Catmon
Dan Jusay is the incumbent.

Compostela
Joel Quiño is the incumbent.

Liloan
Duke Frasco is the incumbent.

Pilar
Jet Fernandez is the incumbent.

Poro
Incumbent Luciano Rama, Jr. is running for his reelection unopposed.

San Francisco
Incumbent Aly Arquilano is running for his reelection unopposed.

Sogod
Moonyeen Durano is the incumbent.

Tudela
Erwin Yu is the incumbent.

6th District, Mayoral Election
 City: Mandaue City
 Municipalities: Consolacion, Cordova

Mandaue City
Jonas Cortes is the incumbent.

Consolacion
Teresa Alegado is the incumbent.

Cordova
Adelino Sitoy is the incumbent.

Cebu City Mayoral Election
Mike Rama is the incumbent. He faced off 2nd District Congressman Tomas Osmeña, who served as mayor from 2001 until 2010. He is the brother of Senator Serge Osmeña and grandson of former president Sergio Osmeña Sr.

Lapu-Lapu City Mayoral Election
Paz Radaza is the incumbent. She faced Liberal Party bet Jun Pelaez.

References

2013 Philippine local elections
Elections in Cebu